In popular culture, the Bro Code is a friendship etiquette to be followed among men or, more specifically, among members of the bro subculture. The term was invented and popularized by Barney Stinson, a character from the television show How I Met Your Mother. Katherine Connor Martin, head of content creation at Oxford Dictionaries, recognized Stinson as "the quintessence of a certain iteration of the contemporary bro".

The notion

Early references 
The notion of an unwritten set of rules that govern the relationship between male friends is present in American popular culture at least since 1991. In the Seinfeld episode "The Stranded", which aired on November 27 that year, Jerry Seinfeld says the following monologue, in one of his stand-up bits:

"Bros before hoes" 
"Bros before hoes" (that is, "man friends before women") is a well-known, slang expression about how men should not abandon their male friends for women they are interested in.

The "bros before hoes" expression is often regarded as the "golden rule" of male friendship, and it has been common slang at least since 2001. It was later used by The Office character Michael Scott in "A Benihana Christmas" in 2006, and further popularized by the TV show character Barney Stinson from How I Met Your Mother.

The Bro Code

Inspired by the notion of Bro Code that they developed in their sitcom, How I Met Your Mother creators Carter Bays and Craig Thomas, and one of the show's writers, Matt Kuhn, wrote a book called The Bro Code. Published by Simon & Schuster, the book covers 150 rules written in articles of what "bros" should or should not do. The book was penned by Barney Stinson and also credited with Kuhn, who also wrote the entries of Barney's blog, mentioned in the series. The book was first shown in the episode "The Goat". Greig Dymond of CBC.ca calls the book "a tongue-in-cheek guide to etiquette for horn-dog dudes." At the end of each episode, a vanity card is used to display a random rule from the Bro Code, similar to what is done on Chuck Lorre–produced shows.

See also
Bro (subculture)
Bromance
Gentlemen's agreement
Man Laws
What happens on tour, stays on tour
Wingman (social)

References

Etiquette
How I Met Your Mother
Masculinity
2000s neologisms